One Hundred Years from Now is the sixth studio album from Dennis DeYoung.

The album was initially released in Canada in 2007, with the first single being the title track, which is a duet in French and English with Éric Lapointe.

The album was released in the United States on April 14, 2009. The track "Respect Me" was removed and tracks "Private Jones" and "There Was a Time" were added. The title track was replaced with a solo recording in English.

Canada Track listing (2007)
All songs written by Dennis DeYoung, except as noted:

 "One Hundred Years from Now" (DeYoung, French lyrics by Éric Lapointe) - 5:03
 "This Time Next Year" - 3:45
 "Rain" - 4:35
 "Save Me" - 5:26
 "Breathe Again" - 5:11
 "Crossing the Rubicon" - 5:51
 "Respect Me" - 4:50
 "I Believe in You" - 4:59
 "Forgiveness" - 4:22
 "I Don't Believe in Anything" - 4:08
 "Turn Off CNN" - 3:05

US Track listing (2009)
All songs written by Dennis DeYoung:

 "One Hundred Years from Now" - 5:03
 "This Time Next Year" - 3:45
 "Rain" - 4:35
 "Crossing the Rubicon" - 5:51
 "Save Me" - 5:26
 "I Don't Believe in Anything" - 4:08
 "Private Jones" - 4:25
 "I Believe in You" - 4:59
 "There Was a Time" - 4:48
 "Breathe Again" - 5:11
 "Forgiveness" - 4:22
 "Turn Off CNN" - 3:05

Personnel
Dennis DeYoung: vocals, keyboards
Tom Dziallo: guitars, dobro
Ernie Denov: guitars, acoustic guitar
Stéphane Dufour: guitars
Jimmy Leahey: acoustic guitar
John Rice: acoustic guitar
Hank Horton: bass guitar, backing vocals
John Blasucci: additional keyboards on "Turn off CNN"
Kyle Woodring: drums
Matthew DeYoung: drums on "I Don't Believe in Anything"
Suzanne DeYoung: backing vocals on "Respect Me"
Kevin Chalfant: backing vocals
Ted Jensen: mastering

Album Artwork
The album artwork is Robert Addison's "Moonlit Merry-Go-Round". The same artist created a piece of art entitled "Paradise Theater", which was used as a model for "The Paradise Theater" album cover.

References

2007 albums
Dennis DeYoung albums